The Croatia national football team represents Croatia in international football matches. It is governed by the Croatian Football Federation (HNS), the governing body for football in Croatia. It is a member of UEFA in Europe and FIFA in global competitions. The team's colors reference two national symbols: the Croatian checkerboard and the country's tricolour.

Since 1994, the  have qualified for every major tournament with the exception of Euro 2000 and the 2010 World Cup. At the FIFA World Cup, Croatia has finished second once (2018) and third on two occasions (1998, 2022), securing three World Cup medals. Davor Šuker won the Golden Shoe and the Silver Ball in 1998, while Luka Modrić won the Golden Ball in 2018 and the Bronze Ball in 2022. The team has reached the quarter-finals of the UEFA European Championship twice (1996, 2008) and is set to contest the semi-finals of the UEFA Nations League in 2023. In July 1998, Croatia recorded its highest-ever Elo rating of 2,006 points.

Upon its admission into FIFA in 1994 ranked 125th, they ascended to third place with their debut 1998 World Cup campaign. This marked the fastest, most volatile ascension in FIFA ranking history, making them the youngest team to ever occupy the Top 10 of the World Ranking. It is the second-smallest country by population (after Uruguay) and land mass (after the Netherlands) to reach a World Cup Final. At the World Cup, Croatia holds records for most penalty shoot-outs played (4) and won (4) and most penalties saved in a shoot-out (3), among other team records. They were named FIFA Best Mover of the Year twice (1994, 1998) equalling joint records with France and Colombia. Croatia maintains sporting rivalries with Italy and Serbia, among other nations, which have led to disruptive matches.

History

Official formation

The early history of Croatian football was delineated by a variety of unofficial sides as Croatia was not an independent entity until the late 20th century. Hugo Kinert first managed an unofficial side that played some international matches in 1918–19. In 1940, Jozo Jakopić led an unofficial national side representing the Yugoslav Banovina of Croatia in four friendly matches against Switzerland and Hungary. Following the 1941 Axis invasion of Yugoslavia, Germany and Italy took control of Croatia, forming the Independent State of Croatia and installing Rudolf Hitrec as an unofficial manager for two years. The side played 15 friendly matches from its re-activation in FIFA in 1941 until the end of World War II. In 1945, Croatia returned to Yugoslavia as the People's Republic of Croatia with sides active until 1956. State authorities organised the Yugoslav Football Tournament in September 1945 to commemorate the end of World War II, where Croatia finished third behind the Yugoslav People's Army and Serbia. Croatia's only game as a constituent republic was a 5–2 win against Indonesia in 1956. During the nation's pre-independence, Croat footballers played for Yugoslavia at the 1956 Summer Olympics, the FIFA World Cup, and the UEFA European Championship until 1990.

On 16 May 1991, three days before Croatia held an independence referendum, the last Yugoslav team to field Croatian players played the Faroe Islands. Croatia had made its unofficial international debut during modern times against the United States on 17 October 1990, winning 2–1, where they introduced the modern checkered jersey. Caretaker manager Dražan Jerković, led the de facto national side before their formal re-admission into FIFA on 3 July 1992, winning two more friendly games against Romania in December 1990 and Slovenia in June 1991. Stanko Poklepović took over management of the team and led them on an exhibition tour against Australia, before he was succeeded by Vlatko Marković in April 1993. Croatia gained admission into UEFA in June 1993, three months after qualification for the 1994 World Cup started, missing their window to enter the competition. After winning a match against Ukraine in June 1993, Marković was succeeded by Miroslav Blažević in March 1994.

Blažević period (1994–1999)

After its break-away from Yugoslavia, the newly formed Croatia entered the FIFA World Rankings in 125th place in March 1994. Blažević launched Croatia's qualifying campaign for Euro 1996 with a 2–0 win over Estonia on 4 September 1994 and a 1–0 away loss to Ukraine on 1 June 1995, their first competitive win and loss. After finishing first in qualifying, the team halved their spot in the World Ranking, ascending to rank 62, winning FIFA's 1994 Best Mover of the Year in December 1994. In the group stage of Euro 1996, Goran Vlaović scored the team's first goal at a tournament, a late strike to win 1–0 against Turkey. Croatia then beat reigning champions Denmark 3–0, later losing to Portugal by the same scoreline. The team advanced to the knockout stage and were beaten in the quarter-finals 1–2 by Germany. Croatia's qualifying campaign from 1998 to 1999 for Euro 2000 was unsuccessful as they finished third in their group behind FR Yugoslavia and the Republic of Ireland. Both fixtures against FR Yugoslavia ended in draws which prevented Croatia from qualifying by one point.

Croatia began their qualification campaign for the 1998 World Cup with an aggregate victory against Ukraine in the two-legged playoff. In the group stage, Croatia beat both Jamaica and Japan, later losing to Argentina to advance with them to the knockout stage. A 1–0 victory over Romania moved the Croatians to the quarter-finals against Germany. Croatia beat the Germans 3–0 with goals from Robert Jarni, Goran Vlaović and Davor Šuker, all after Christian Wörns had been sent off. They advanced to their first semi-finals against the hosts France. After a goalless first-half, Croatia led after Aljoša Asanović pushed past Zinedine Zidane to cross a ball downfield to Šuker who scored after a one-on-one with goalkeeper Fabien Barthez. France's defender Lilian Thuram equalized quickly after, and scored another goal later in the game to beat Croatia 2–1. In the third place playoff, Croatia prevailed against the Netherlands 2–1 to secure bronze and claim their first World Cup medal. Šuker won the Golden Shoe for scoring the most goals in the World Cup: six goals in seven games. The Croatians' performance during the late-1990s propelled them to rank third place in the FIFA World Ranking in January 1999. The team of the 1990s was dubbed the "golden generation" for their contributions to Croatia's ascension in international football.

Jozić, Barić and Kranjčar period (2000–2006)

Croatia started their qualifying campaign for the 2002 World Cup with draws against Belgium and Scotland prompting Blažević's resignation as head coach in October 2000. His successor, Mirko Jozić, pushed the team through the rest of qualifiers undefeated. In the group stage, Croatia narrowly lost to Mexico before beating Italy 2–1 and sustaining a 1–0 loss to Ecuador. The team was eliminated by one point, leading to the resignation of Jozić and succession of Otto Barić in July 2002, their first manager born outside of Southeastern Europe. During Barić's tenure, most of the remaining players from the "golden generation" squad were gradually replaced by younger players over the course of qualifying for Euro 2004. Croatia qualified in a playoff victory against Slovenia, winning 2–1 on aggregate after Dado Pršo's decisive late goal in the second leg. The team was eliminated at the group stage after drawing 0–0 with Switzerland and 2–2 with France, and losing 2–4 to England. Barić departed after his two-year contract expired in June 2004.

Prior to launching the team's qualification for the 2006 World Cup, Zlatko Kranjčar succeed Barić in July 2004. Croatia qualified undefeated, topping the group ahead of Sweden and Bulgaria. Kranjčar selected his son, Niko, for the national squad, leading local media outlets to accuse him of nepotism. In the group stage, Croatia lost their opening game to Brazil and drew 0–0 with Japan after Darijo Srna missed a first-half penalty. A 2–2 draw with Australia in which three players were sent off confirmed Croatia's elimination. The game included a mistake by referee Graham Poll who gave three yellow cards to Croatian defender Josip Šimunić, mistaking him for an Australian player due to his Australian accent.

Bilić period (2006–2012)

In July 2006, prior to Euro 2008, Kranjčar was replaced with Slaven Bilić, who introduced newer, younger players to the squad and finished qualifying undefeated. His first game was a 2–0 victory against reigning world champions Italy during an international friendly. Croatia lost once to Macedonia and beat England twice, who as a result failed to qualify for the first time since 1984. Eduardo da Silva, the team's top goalscorer during qualifying, sustained an injury while playing for his club, Arsenal, leading to a shake-up in the finals squad with less experienced players. Croatia finished group stage undefeated with a 1–0 win over co-hosts Austria, 2–1 win over Germany, and 1–0 win over Poland. The team collected the maximum group stage points possible (9) for the first time in their Euros history. Niko Kovač and Dario Šimić held captaincy during the group and knockout stages, respectively. Croatia pushed Turkey to a penalty shoot-out in the quarter-finals in which the Turkish side prevailed in an upset win where Luka Modrić, Mladen Petrić and Ivan Rakitić all missed their penalties. Croatia set multiple Euro records: fewest goals conceded (2), fewest games lost (0), and earliest goal scored.

Bilić renewed his contract in April 2008, before the qualifying campaign for the 2010 World Cup. Croatia won 3–0 against Kazakhstan, before taking a 4–1 loss to England at Stadion Maksimir, their first home loss in 14 years. The team drew 0–0 with Ukraine and beat Andorra twice, drawing again with Ukraine and beating Belarus twice. In the final stretch of the qualifiers, England delivered Croatia's then-heaviest loss, a 5–1 scoreline, at Wembley Stadium. The team had a number of players' injuries during qualifying and were ultimately eliminated, on points, as Ukraine defeated both England and Andorra to advance in the group.

Croatia was a candidate to co-host Euro 2012 with Hungary which would have resulted in automatic qualification for both countries; UEFA ultimately selected Poland and Ukraine. The Croatians began their qualifying campaign for Euro 2012 with a 3–0 win over Latvia, a goalless draw with Greece, and a 2–1 win against Israel. In the qualifying playoff against Turkey, the team won 3–0 on aggregate. They were grouped with the Republic of Ireland, Italy and defending champions Spain, opening with a 3–1 victory over the Irish. Croatia drew the match with Italy 1–1 in an Adriatic Derby that was marred by disruptive fans and controversial refereeing from English official Howard Webb. The side was knocked out by Spain in a 0–1 loss, which, along with 1–1 rematch with Italy, had Croatia eliminated. Bilić announced his resignation plans before Euro 2012 and, upon his departure, Jutarnji list credited him with a "strong revival" of the national side during his six-years. During Bilić's tenure, from 2007 to 2012, the Croatians continuously ranked among the top ten teams in the world on the FIFA Ranking.

Štimac, Kovač and Čačić period (2012–2017)

Succeeding Bilić, former player Igor Štimac was appointed manager while Davor Šuker assumed the presidency of the Croatian Football Federation in 2012 after the death of Vlatko Marković. A year in, Štimac was replaced by former captain Niko Kovač. Kovač led the team to a 2–0 aggregate victory over Iceland in the qualifying playoffs for the 2014 World Cup with both goals coming in the home leg in Zagreb. In the group stage, Croatia opened their campaign with a 3–1 loss to Brazil. The match garnered media attention for controversial refereeing from Yuichi Nishimura which was scrutinized for a number of decisions. In their second match, Croatia won 4–0 against Cameroon then lost 3–1 to Mexico, finishing third in the group and not advancing to the knockout stage.

During the qualifying campaign of Euro 2016, Croatia drew with Azerbaijan and lost to Norway, leading to Kovač's replacement with Ante Čačić. The team broke their record for most goals scored in a match with a friendly 10–0 win over San Marino in June 2016. They topped the group stage of that year's Euros, advancing with defending champions Spain. Croatia prevailed over Turkey 1–0 with a long-range volley goal from Luka Modrić, before drawing 2–2 draw against the Czech Republic. In the latter match, Croatia took the lead with goals from Ivan Perišić and Ivan Rakitić, while opposing Czech striker Milan Škoda and a last-minute penalty from Tomáš Necid drew the match. There was severe crowd trouble and on-field flares in the game's last minutes with a steward injured by a stray firework. Croatia then overtook Spain 2–1, confirming the Spaniards' first defeat at a Euro finals match since 2004. The Croatians were tipped as one of the tournament favourites as they entered the knockout stage with Portugal. The Portuguese prevailed 1–0 with Ricardo Quaresma's winning goal in the 117th minute after Perišić hit the post with a header in the previous attack. It was an "abysmal...turgid affair" between the two sides, according to BBC Sport. Following the campaign, Darijo Srna announced his retirement and the succession of Modrić as team captain in August 2016.

Dalić period (since 2017)

Croatia qualified for the 2018 World Cup undefeated for their first five matches. Two defeats to Iceland and Turkey, as well as a draw against Finland, led to a public outcry that ousted manager Čačić. He was replaced by Zlatko Dalić, who formally qualified the team with a 2–0 win against Ukraine, and a 4–1 win with Greece, on aggregate, during a playoff round in the first leg in Zagreb. The 2017–18 squad was known as Croatia's second "golden generation", referencing their 1998 counterparts, during the side's World Cup campaign. They topped their group, with a 2–0 victory over Nigeria, 3–0 win over Argentina, and a 2–1 win with Iceland – their best-ever group stage performance.

During the knockout stage, they beat Denmark in a penalty shoot-out for the first time after goalkeeper Danijel Subašić saved three penalties, equalling the record for most penalties saved in a shoot-out. In the quarter-finals, Croatia drew 2–2 with hosts Russia, becoming the first team since 1990 to win two consecutive penalty shoot-outs. Playing England in the semi-finals, Croatia equalized to force their third consecutive extra time, matching the tournament record. Mario Mandžukić and Perišić scored as Croatia won 2–1 making them the second-smallest country by population (after Uruguay) and land mass (after the Netherlands) to reach a World Cup Final. In the 2018 World Cup Final they lost to France 4–2, finishing second-place and securing the silver medal. The match was controversial for its refereeing. Luka Modrić became the first Croatian to win the Golden Ball. The team was welcomed by an estimated half a million people at their homecoming in Zagreb.

The team entered the Nations League's inaugural 2018–19 edition in League A, along with England and Spain in January 2018. Croatia lost 6–0 away to Spain in their first game, the side's record loss in a match. Croatia drew 0–0 home with England, played behind closed doors due to UEFA sanctions. The team then overtook Spain 3–2 with a goal in stoppage time, followed by a 2–1 away defeat to England. Croatia were set to be relegated to League B until a tournament rule change retained them in League A, grouping them with Portugal, France and Sweden in the 2020–21 tournament. Croatia lost to France and Portugal, but a single victory against Sweden was sufficient to avoid relegation to League B.

The team topped their group for the qualifying campaign of Euro 2020, with a loss to Hungary, and draws against Azerbaijan and Wales. The 2020 finals were delayed into 2021 due to the COVID-19 pandemic in Europe. Overall, winning only two out of eight games in 2020, Croatia achieved their worst aggregate win-rate in their history. Croatia finished second in their Euros group, with a 1–0 loss to England, a 1–1 tie with the Czech Republic and a 3–1 win over Scotland. They advanced to the round of 16, where they lost to Spain 5–3 after extra time. The loss to Spain led to heightened criticism against Dalić and the team by the Croatian public, a faction of whom called for resignations. Dalić refreshed the team roster by introducing younger debutants for the remainder of World Cup qualifying in 2021.

Croatia qualified for the 2022 World Cup with one loss, two draws and seven wins. The team advanced from group stage after a 0–0 draw with Morocco, a 4–1 win with Canada, and finished ahead of Belgium by a single point after drawing 0–0. They won against Japan in a penalty shootout in the round of 16 where Dominik Livaković saved three of four Japanese penalties, equalling a record held by Ricardo and Danijel Subašić. Croatia similarly beat Brazil during the quarter-finals in an upset victory on penalties, having come from behind to draw 1–1 in the final minutes of extra time. In the semi-final match, Croatia sustained their heaviest World Cup defeat, 3–0 against Argentina. They prevailed 2–1 over Morocco in the third place playoff, securing their second bronze medal.

The team topped their group in the 2023 Nations League, knocking out reigning champions France by winning 1–0 on a penalty – their first-ever win against the French. Croatia is set to contest the semi-finals against the Netherlands on 14–15 June 2023.

Image

Kits

Croatia's modern-day team jersey was created in 1990 by Miroslav Šutej who also designed the nation's flag, coat of arms and first currency. The red-and-white motif is based on the Croatian checkerboard. The typical kit color-way features red-and-white checkered shirts, white shorts and blue socks to match the Croatian tricolor (Trobojnica). There have been variations made by the kit manufacturers since the original release; the jersey design has remained consistent throughout the years and has served as a blueprint for other Croatian national sports teams and entities.

Away kits used by the team have for a period been all-blue, incorporating the red-and-white checkers as a trim. Croatia has moved to using darker away kits such as the dark navy-and-black checkered design that featured prominently in the 2018 World Cup campaign. The  have been required to use their darker away kits even when playing at home because their opponents have red-and-white jerseys that clash with the checkers of Croatia.

Supporters 

The team has developed an extensive fan base since its unofficial formation in 1990. Following their debut run at the 1998 World Cup, there was a rise in domestic and global attention for the side. Political scientist Alex J. Bellamy observed in 2003 that the national team became a symbol of statehood in Croatia after their independence through the cultural export of Croatian football. The government's influence on team affairs eased substantially after the death of President Franjo Tuđman in 1999. All matches are followed and televised throughout the country, particularly during major tournaments. In November 2022, the Ministry of Science and Education issued guidance to let school children watch matches during the school day as long coursework is made up later. Following the 2018 World Cup, the Croatian Cabinet attended ministerial meetings in team jerseys, and during the 2022 World Cup, Prime Minister Andrej Plenković delivered a hurried speech "[lasting] only 37 seconds" at the Euro-Mediterranean Summit to catch the quarter-finals.

A part of the team's support consists of fans of Dinamo Zagreb and Hajduk Split, the two largest clubs in Croatia's top domestic football league, the Hrvatska nogometna liga (HNL). Both sets of fans—Bad Blue Boys from Zagreb and Torcida from Split—have been associated with hooliganism due to their ultra-style support, though violence between them does not occur at international matches. Other ultras groups are Armada Rijeka, Kohorta Osijek, Ultras Vinkovci, Tornado Zadar, Funcuti Šibenik and Demoni Pula. Support for the team also comes from Croats of Bosnia and Herzegovina, particularly from fans of Zrinjski Mostar and Široki Brijeg. There are also Croatian communities in Australia, North America and South America that follow the team. The team's fanbase is known for their use of pyrotechnics, fireworks, and flares at matches and while celebrating. During the qualifiers of Euro 2016, Croatian fans disrupted matches against Italy and the Czech Republic by throwing flares from the stadium onto the field.

Among supporters, it is customary to include an inscription of their city of origin onto the Croatian flag to indicate where they are from. Fans also coordinate their vocal support and orchestrate chants during matches. One section may shout U boj, u boj ("To battle, to battle") with another responding Za narod svoj ("For our people"). When the team wins, supporters might chant Bježite ljudi, bježite iz grada ("Run away people, run away from the city") which is a song praising the presence of Croatian fans. The Croatian Football Federation endorses an official fan club for the team, known as Uvijek Vjerni ("Always Faithful"). In addition to chants, the team receives support from various local musicians, who release songs dedicated to them. Former manager Slaven Bilić and his rock band released a single, Vatreno ludilo ("Fiery Madness"), which reached the top position on Croatian music charts during Euro 2008. Other Croatian artists such as Baruni, Connect, Dino Dvornik, Gibonni, Prljavo kazalište, Colonia, Stoka, Nered and Thompson have also recorded songs mentioning the team. Some of those having been used among supporters are Moja domovina ("My Homeland"), Srce vatreno ("Fiery Heart"), Hrvatska je prvak svijeta ("Croatia Are World Champions") and Malo nas je, al' nas ima ("We Are Few, But We Exist"). Most popular among the fans and played at every home match is Lijepa li si ("How Beautiful You Are") by Thompson and fans sing it themselves during the match. Bad Blue Boys supporters from Zaprešić made their band Zaprešić Boys and made some songs for each tournament like Samo je jedno ("Only One Thing"), U pobjedi i porazu ("In Victory and Defeat") Neopisivo ("Indescribable"), Igraj moja Hrvatska ("Play, My Croatia"), with the latter being an unofficial anthem during the 2018 World Cup.

Fans' behaviour, hooliganism, and ultra-style rioting during matches has led to sanctions both domestically and internationally. The football federation, Croatian government, and players have made efforts to prevent unwanted incidents in order to avoid damage to the perception of the team and Croatian people. This has included banning their own fans from certain games. The behaviour of fans has led to penalties and fines for the national team imposed by FIFA and UEFA. Certain disruptive behaviour is centered on ethno-nationalist racism and fascism stemming from the dissolution of Yugoslavia. The Croatian Football Federation has been fined £14,920 for fans' racist taunts against English striker Emile Heskey in 2010, €80,000 for a fan throwing a banana at Italian striker Mario Balotelli in 2012, €100,000 for inadvertently hosting a match against Italy with a faint swastika etched into the pitch in 2016, and $53,000 for a crowd of fans' anti-Serb taunts against Canadian keeper Milan Borjan in 2022. The team has been fined for similar incidents and received additional sanctions such as having to play matches without fans, including the October 2018 Nations League game against England. There have also been multiple acts of protest against the national team, in response to allegations of corruption within the Croatian Football Federation, and other fan disturbances.

Charity 
To advance the team's charitable efforts manager Slaven Bilić established the Vatreno Srce (Fiery Heart) Foundation in 2010. The primary cause of the foundation is helping children. As of 2012, the foundation made fifty donations of 1,200,000 HRK to various children's organizations. In December 2012, the foundation made 500,000 HRK on an auction of Niko Kranjčar's shirt and Lionel Messi's shirt that was signed by all FC Barcelona players. The auction was organized in Esplanade Zagreb Hotel and attended by President of Croatia Ivo Josipović. In November 2018, the players gathered in The Westin Hotel in Zagreb to answer fans' phonecalls, the proceeds of which were donated to the Vatreno Srce Foundation. In 2018, the foundation financed Children's Hospital Zagreb and Korak u Život (A Step Into Life), a charity that helps young children raised in orphanages make the transition into higher education. In November 2019, more than 500,000 HRK was collected in another call event that were then directed to Children's Hospital Kantrida. In March 2020, the players collectively donated 4,200,000 HRK for fighting the COVID-19 pandemic and for repair of damage caused by the 2020 Zagreb earthquake.

Stadiums
The majority of Croatia's home matches take place at Stadion Maksimir in Zagreb, which is also the home-ground of local football club Dinamo Zagreb. The venue, built in 1912 and refurbished in 1997, is named after the surrounding neighbourhood of Maksimir. It was one of two venues for Euro 1976, hosted by Yugoslavia, alongside Red Star Stadium in Belgrade. It has hosted national team games since Croatia's competitive home debut against Lithuania. The Croatian Football Federation previously agreed on extensive plans with the government to renovate the stadium and increase its forty-thousand seating capacity, the proposal was eventually rejected by Mayor of Zagreb Milan Bandić in 2008 due to construction costs.

Some home matches are occasionally played at other, smaller venues around the country. Stadion Poljud in Split has hosted some qualifying fixtures since 1995, the first being a 1–1 draw with Italy. In the period between 1995 and 2011, Croatia never won a competitive match at Poljud, which the local media dubbed Poljudsko prokletsvo ("the Poljud curse"). The run was finally ended after the team came from behind to beat Georgia on 3 June 2011. Qualifying fixtures have also been played at Stadion Kantrida in Rijeka along with Stadion Gradski Vrt in Osijek and Stadion Varteks in Varaždin. These venues are less used due to their more remote locations and smaller seating capacity, with objections from local residents and some players. Since Croatia's first match in October 1990, they played home games at eleven stadiums around the country. The following table provides a summary of Croatia's results at home venues.

Rivalries

 Croatia vs. Italy: Matches with Italy are known as the Adriatic Derby (Italian: Derby Adriatico) named after the Adriatic Sea that separates the two nations. Croatia has never lost against Italy, with most fixtures played in qualifications and at tournament. The two sides have competed in the qualifiers and group stages of Euro 1996, Euro 2012 and Euro 2016 with multiple incidences of crowd trouble and flares being thrown onto the pitch. They have only met at the 2002 World Cup, in a group stage match where Croatia came from behind to beat Italy 2–1, after two Italian goals were controversially disallowed. This rivalry can be confused with the similarly named Adriatic derby between Croatian clubs Hajduk and Rijeka.
 Croatia vs. Serbia: Matches with Serbia developed into a formal rivalry following the Croatian War of Independence. Football games with the two sides are politically charged and have been known to devolve into crowd trouble with flare disturbances, and fan riots, such as the 1990 Dinamo–Red Star riot in Zagreb. Due to its history and link to national identity, it has been described as one as one of the "fiercest rivalries in the world" by CNN. Enhanced security protocols and travel restrictions are instated during matches against Serbia.
 Croatia vs. France: Matches with France became competitive and evolved into a rivalry during the 1990s. During the 1998 World Cup, France beat Croatia in the semi-finals, eventually winning the tournament while Croatia placed third. The two sides contested the 2018 World Cup Final, where France prevailed again and Croatia took second place. France was undefeated against Croatia until 2022, when the Croatians shut them out of the 2023 Nations League finals, stripping the French of their championship title.
 Croatia vs. England: Matches with England turned into a rivalry in 2006 when the Croatians shut the English out of Euro 2008. The rivalry intensified in 2008 and 2009 after England beat them 5–1 in London and then 4–0 in Zagreb, delivering Croatia's then-heaviest loss, and ending a 14-year unbeaten home record, respectively. Croatia knocked them out of the 2018 World Cup in the semi-finals, after England's publicized "It's Coming Home" campaign. The rivalry has been described as "England’s major international rivalry of the 21st Century" by Evening Standard.

Results and fixtures

The following matches have been played within the past 12 months.
Times are CET/CEST, in accordance with Croatian local time (local times if different, are in parentheses).

2022

2023

Coaching staff

Coaching history
The following table provides a summary of the complete record of each Croatia manager's results in the FIFA World Cup and UEFA European Championship.

Players

Current squad

The following is the squad for the UEFA Euro 2024 qualifying games against Wales on 25 March 2023 and Turkey on 28 March 2023.

Recent call-ups
The following players have been called up to the squad in the last 12 months and are still eligible for selection.

INJ = Injured or ill.
WD = Withdrew.
SUS = Suspended from participating.
RET = Retired after latest call-up.
U21 = Joined the Croatia U21 team instead.
PRE = Preliminary squad.

Individual record

Players in bold are still active with Croatia.

Most capped players

Surpassing Robert Jarni's previous record of 81 appearances, Dario Šimić was the first player to reach 100 appearances, doing so before his retirement in 2008. Darijo Srna, Josip Šimunić and Stipe Pletikosa collectively reached their 100th cap in February 2013. Srna was the most capped player from 2016 to 2021, with 134 appearances. He was surpassed by Luka Modrić in 2021.

The youngest player to play for Croatia is Alen Halilović (aged ), while the oldest is Dražen Ladić.

Top goalscorers

Davor Šuker is Croatia's highest goalscorer with a record 45 international goals from 1991 to 2002.

The team's youngest goalscorer is Luka Ivanušec (aged ).

Most clean sheets

Competitive record

FIFA World Cup

UEFA European Championship

UEFA Nations League

Other

Head-to-head record

Key

FIFA ranking history
The following is a chart of yearly averages of Croatia's FIFA World Ranking. Upon admission to FIFA in 1994, Croatia entered the World Ranking at 125th. Their debut World Cup campaign, during 1998, propelled Croatia to third place after the tournament, marking the fastest, most volatile ascension in FIFA ranking history. It held that rank until February 1999. During their first World Cup, Croatia reached its highest-ever Elo rating of 2,006 points on July 11, 1998. With an average Elo rating of 1,876 points, Croatia maintains the sixth-highest average rating in the world. They are one of three teams—along with Colombia and France—to be named FIFA Best Mover of the Year more than once, winning the award in 1994 and 1998.

Honours

Major 
FIFA World Cup

  Runner-up: 2018
  Third place: 1998, 2022

UEFA Nations League

 1st–4th: 2022–23

Minor 
Hassan II Trophy

  Champions: 1996

Kirin Soccer Cup

  Runners-up: 1997

Korea Cup

  Champions: 1999

Lunar New Year Cup

  Third place: 2006

See also

 Croatia national football B team
 Croatia national under-23 football team
 Croatia national under-21 football team
 Croatia national under-20 football team
 Croatia national under-19 football team
 Croatia national under-18 football team
 Croatia national under-17 football team
 Croatia national under-16 football team
 Croatia women's national football team
 Croatia women's national under-19 football team
 Croatia women's national under-17 football team

Notes

References

Further reading

External links

 Official website 
 Croatia at UEFA 
 Croatia at FIFA
 Croatia – Player statistics at RSSSF (Last updated 22 September 2022)

1990 establishments in Croatia
 µ
European national association football teams
Football in Croatia